The George Madison Millard House, is a Frank Lloyd Wright designed Prairie School home that was constructed in Highland Park, Illinois, United States in 1906. It was the first of two houses that Wright would design for the Millards.

History
George Madison Millard was the manager of the rare book department of A. C. McClurg in Chicago, Illinois. Millard met his wife Alice (née Parsons) at the bookstore; they married at St Bride's Church in London in 1901. The Millards were acquainted with Frank Lloyd Wright and had him design this house in Highland Park in 1906 after the couple moved from the South Side of Chicago.

The house is a typical example of Wright's Prairie School houses. The floor plan is cruciform in design. The exterior walls are brown-stained board and batten siding laid horizontally. The roof is hipped with  overhangs. Wright later included drawings of the Millard house in his Wasmuth Portfolio.

The Millards moved to Pasadena, California in 1913 after George retired from McClurg. Following the death of her husband, Alice carried on her husband's profession and also sold antique furniture. She had Wright design the Millard House in Pasadena in 1923. The Highland Park house was recognized by the National Park Service with a listing on the National Register of Historic Places on September 29, 1982. It was listed as part of the Highland Park Multiple Resource Area. The house in Pasadena is also listed in the National Register.

References

 Storrer, William Allin. The Frank Lloyd Wright Companion. University Of Chicago Press, 2006,  (S.126)

External links

Site about the Pasadena Millard house
Millard House on peterbeers.net
Millard House on dgunning.org
Photo of the Millard House

Millard House slideshow

Frank Lloyd Wright buildings
Highland Park, Illinois
Houses on the National Register of Historic Places in Illinois
National Register of Historic Places in Lake County, Illinois
Houses in Lake County, Illinois